Here's to Life! is a Canadian comedy-drama film by Arne Olsen, released in 2000.

Plot
The film stars Eric McCormack as Owen Rinard, an uptight retirement home administrator in Spokane, who is caught cheating on the company's taxes by a resident, and is blackmailed into taking Gus (James Whitmore), Nelly (Kim Hunter), and Duncan (Ossie Davis) on a trip to Victoria, British Columbia, so that each can experience a long-held dream: Gus wants to go salmon fishing in the Pacific Ocean; Nelly, a former music teacher, wants to attend the symphony; and Duncan, a retired boxer, wants to attend a highly anticipated prize fight in Vancouver. Owen himself, in turn, meets and connects romantically with Carley (Marya Delver), an employee in the hotel casino.

Production
The film's original working title was Old Hats. It was filmed in Victoria in the summer of 1999.

The film's score was composed by Patric Caird. It also included several original songs by Michael Bublé, several years before he rose to international fame.

Critical response
In The Globe and Mail, Ray Conlogue wrote that Whitmore, Hunter, and Davis kept the movie watchable, but concluded that "Here's to Life starts briskly, develops shakily and finishes preposterously. Only those who have been really rotten to their aged parents should see this movie, and then only by way of expiation." Ken Eisner of Variety called it a "by-the-numbers heartwarmer" which had the potential to be modestly successful among older audiences, but was likely to play better on television than in a theatre.

Awards
The film garnered eight Genie Award nominations at the 21st Genie Awards in 2001:
Best Actor: James Whitmore
Best Actress: Kim Hunter
Best Costume Design: Patricia Hargreaves
Best Sound: Bill Sheppard, Mark Berger and Ruth Huddleston
Best Sound Editing: Dean Giammarco, Maija Burnett, Kris Fenske, John Ludgate and Brendan Ostrander
Best Original Song: Michael Bublé, "Dumb Ol' Heart" and "I've Never Been in Love Before"
Best Original Score: Patric Caird

References

External links
 

2000 films
2000 comedy-drama films
Canadian comedy-drama films
English-language Canadian films
Films shot in British Columbia
Films set in British Columbia
2000s English-language films
2000s Canadian films